is a Japanese voice actor from Tokyo. He is a member of 81 Produce.

Miki is known for his distinctively smooth voice and often calm delivery in the roles he has landed. He often gets cast as handsome young men in anime, perhaps the most notable being Youji Kudou – Balinese (Weiß Kreuz) and Kojirō ("James") (Pokémon). Other famous roles include Takumi Fujiwara (Initial D anime, video game and mostly Arcade Stage series from Arcade Stage 4 to Arcade Stage 8 Infinity), Kisuke Urahara (Bleach), Akira Yuki (Virtua Fighter), Lockon Stratos (Mobile Suit Gundam 00), Tatsuma Sakamoto (Gintama), Teppei Iwaki (Area no Kishi), Aikurō Mikisugi (Kill la Kill), Hitomi (Code: Breaker), Kagetora Aida (Kuroko's Basketball), Roy Mustang (Fullmetal Alchemist: Brotherhood), Zamasu (Dragon Ball Super), Bob Makihara (Tenejō Tenge), Keisuke Yuuki (Fushigi Yuugi) and Deishū Kaiki (Monogatari Series)

Miki is also a singer among the four-man band Weiß, along with Takehito Koyasu, Tomokazu Seki and Hiro Yūki, the four main voice actors of Weiß Kreuz. Miki is also very active in BL dramas. He won Best Actor in supporting roles in the 4th Seiyu Awards. 

As well as voicing Kojirō, Miki (alongside Mika Kanai, Satomi Kōrogi, Unshō Ishizuka and many other Japanese voice actors) also appears in the Japanese and English language versions of Pokémon, where he voiced many of the titular creatures such as Misty's Staryu, Brock's Zubat/Golbat/Crobat and Ash's Charizard.

Filmography

Television animation
{| class="wikitable"
! Year
! Title
! Role
! Notes
! Source
|-
| rowspan="2" | 1994 || Aoki Densetsu Shoot! || Rudy Erick (First) || ||
|-
| Captain Tsubasa J || Genzo Wakabayashi || ||
|-
| rowspan="2" | 1995 || Fushigi Yūgi series || Keisuke Yūki || ||
|-
|Virtua Fighter series
|Akira Yuki
|
|
|-
|1996
|The Vision of Escaflowne
|Allen Schezar/Susumu Amano
|
|
|-
| 1997 || Pocket Monsters || Kojirō (James), Satoshi's Hitokage/Lizardo/Lizardon (Ash's Charmander/Charmeleon/Charizard), Takeshi's Isitsubute (Brock's Geodude), Takeshi's Zubat (Brock's Zubat), Kasumi's Hitodeman (Misty's Staryu) || || 
|-
| rowspan="2" | 1998 || Weiss Kreuz || Youji Kudou || ||
|-
| Initial D First Stage || Takumi Fujiwara || ||
|-
| rowspan="4" | 1999 || Kaikan Phrase || Yukifumi "Yuki" Todo || ||
|-
| Initial D Second Stage || Takumi Fujiwara || ||
|-
| Pocket Monsters: Episode Orange Archipelago || Kojirō (James), Satoshi's Lizardon (Ash's Charizard), Takeshi's Isitsubute (Brock's Geodude), Takeshi's Zubat (Brock's Zubat), Kasumi's Hitodeman (Misty's Staryu), Kasumi's Nyoromo/Nyorozo/Nyorotono (Misty's Poliwag) || || 
|-
| Pocket Monsters: Episode Gold & Silver || Kojirō (James), Satoshi's Lizardon (Ash's Charizard), Takeshi's Isitsubute (Brock's Geodude), Takeshi's Zubat/Golbat/Crobat (Brock's Zubat/Golbat/Crobat), Kasumi's Hitodeman (Misty's Staryu), Kasumi's Nyoromo/Nyorozo/Nyorotono (Misty's Poliwag/Poliwhirl/Politoed) || || 
|-
| rowspan="3" | 2000 || Descendants of Darkness || Asato Tsuzuki || ||
|-
| Gravitation (manga) || Taki Aizawa || ||
|-
| Mewtwo! I Am Here || Kojirō (James), Takeshi's Isitsubute (Brock's Geodude), Takeshi's Golbat (Brock's Golbat), Kasumi's Hitodeman (Misty's Staryu), Kasumi's Nyorozo (Misty's Poliwhirl), Mewtwo's Lizardontwo (Mewtwo's Charizardtwo/Clone Charizard) ||  || 
|-
| 2001 || Shaman King || Krysler || ||
|-
| rowspan="5" | 2002 || Naruto || Mizuki || ||
|-
| Pocket Monsters Side Stories || Kojirō (James), Takeshi's Isitsubute (Brock's Geodude), Takeshi's Crobat (Brock's Crobat) || || 
|-
| Pocket Monsters: Advanced Generation || Kojirō (James), Satoshi's Lizardon (Ash's Charizard), Satoshi's Cotoise (Ash's Torkoal), Takeshi's Isitsubute (Brock's Geodude), Takeshi's Crobat (Brock's Crobat), Shū's Flygon (Drew's Flygon) || || 
|-
| Full Metal Panic! || Kurz Weber || ||
|-
| Tokyo Underground || Seki || ||
|-
| rowspan="3" | 2003 || Air Master || Shigeo Komada || ||
|-
| Full Metal Panic? Fumoffu || Kurz Weber || ||
|-
| Detective Conan || Kenji Hagiwara || ||
|-
| rowspan="4" | 2004 || Bleach || Kisuke Urahara || ||
|-
| Gakuen Alice || Persona/Rei Serio || ||
|-
| Initial D Fourth Stage || Takumi Fujiwara || ||
|-
|Tenjho Tenge
|Bob Makihara
|
|
|-
| rowspan="6" | 2005 || Tsubasa: RESERVoir CHRoNiCLE || Toya || || 
|-
| Black Cat || Creed Diskenth || ||
|-
| Kyo Kara Maoh! || Shinou || ||
|-
| Sukisho || Shinichiro Minato || ||
|-
| Full Metal Panic! The Second Raid || Kurz Weber || 
||
|-
| Harukanaru Toki no Naka de || Minamoto no Yorihisa || ||
|-
| rowspan="7" | 2006 || Fate/stay night || Assassin || || 
|-
| Gakuen Heaven || Yukihiko Naruse || ||
|-
| .hack//Roots || Kuhn || || 
|-
| Gin Tama || Tatsuma Sakamoto || ||
|-
| D.Gray-man || Bak Chan || ||
|-
| The Mastermind of Mirage Pokémon || Kojirō (James), Kasumi's Hitodeman (Misty's Staryu) || ||

|-
| Pocket Monsters: Diamond and Pearl || Kojirō (James), Satoshi's Naetle/Hayashigame/Dodaitose (Ash's Turtwig/Grotle/Torterra), Shinji's Donkarasu (Paul's Honchkrow), Jun's Mukuhawk (Barry's Staraptor), Saturn's Dokurog (Saturn's Toxicroak) || || 
|-
| rowspan="4" | 2007 || Strait Jacket || Leiot Steinberg || || 
|-
| Wangan Midnight || Tatsuya Shima || || 
|-
|Darker Than Black
|Eric Nishijima
|
|
|-
|Mobile Suit Gundam 00
|Neil Dylandy, Lyle Dylandy
|
|
|-
| rowspan="3" | 2008 || Mobile Suit Gundam 00 Second Season
|Lyle Dylandy ||
|- 
| Antique Bakery || Yusuke Ono || ||
|-
| Golgo 13 || Katz Double || Ep. 11 ||
|-
| 2009 || Fullmetal Alchemist: Brotherhood || Roy Mustang || || 
|-
| rowspan="3" | 2010 || Hakuōki || Hijikata Toshizo || ||
|-
| The Betrayal Knows My Name || Tachibana Giou || ||
|-
| Pocket Monsters: Best Wishes! || Kojirō (James), Dent's Ishizumai/Iwapalace (Cilan's Dwebble/Crustle), Shooty's Tsutarja (Trip's Snivy) ||  || 
|-
| rowspan="3" | 2011 || Gin Tama' || Tatsuma Sakamoto || ||
|-
| No. 6 || You Ming || ||
|-
| Carnival Phantasm || Assassin || ||
|-
| rowspan="6" | 2012 || Area no Kishi || Teppei Iwaki || ||
|-
| Initial D Fifth Stage || Takumi Fujiwara || ||
|-
| Kuroko's Basketball || Kagetora Aida || ||
|-
| Magi: The Labyrinth of Magic || Ithnan / Markkio || ||
|-
| Nisemonogatari || Deishū Kaiki || || 
|-
| Pocket Monsters: Best Wishes! Season 2 || Kojirō (James), Dent's Iwapalace (Cilan's Crustle) || || 
|-
| rowspan="9" | 2013 ||Code: Breaker || Hitomi || ||
|-
| Hajime No Ippo: Rising || Sawamura Ryūhei || ||
|-
| Hunter × Hunter || Knov || || 
|-
| Kill la Kill || Aikurō Mikisugi || || 
|-
| Monogatari Series Second Season || Deishū Kaiki || ||
|-
| Pocket Monsters: Best Wishes! Season 2: Episode N || Kojirō (James), Satoshi's Hitokage/Lizardo/Lizardon (Ash's Charmander/Charmeleon/Charizard), Dent's Iwapalace (Cilan's Crustle) || || 
|-
| Pocket Monsters: Best Wishes! Season 2: Decolora Adventure || Kojirō (James), Satoshi's Lizardon (Ash's Charizard), Dent's Iwapalace (Cilan's Crustle) || || 
|-
| Pocket Monsters: XY || Kojirō (James), Satoshi's Luchabull (Ash's Hawlucha), Tierno's Kameil (Tierno's Wartortle) || || 
|-
|Pocket Monsters: The Origin||Red's Hitokage/Lizardo/Lizardon (Red's Charmander/Charmeleon/Charizard) ||  || 
|-
| rowspan="7" | 2014 || Donten ni Warau || Naoto Kagami || ||
|-
| Trinity Seven || Master Biblia || || 
|-
| Black Bullet || Shouma Nagisawa || ||
|-
|Amagi Brilliant Park || Jaw || ||
|-
| Initial D Final Stage || Takumi Fujiwara || ||
|-
|Haikyu!! || Oiwake Takurō (Date Tech Coach) || ||
|-
|Log Horizon || K R || ||
|-
| rowspan="6" | 2015 || Gin Tama° || Tatsuma Sakamoto || ||
|-
| Tai-Madō Gakuen 35 Shiken Shōtai || Sōgetsu Ōtori || ||
|-
| The Seven Deadly Sins || Slader || ||
|-
| Fate/Stay Night - Unlimited Blade Works || Assassin || ||
|-
| One Punch Man || Snek || ||
|-
| Pocket Monsters: XY&Z || Kojirō (James), Satoshi's Luchabull (Ash's Hawlucha) || || 
|-
| rowspan="6" | 2016 || Dragon Ball Super || Zamasu || ||
|-
| One Piece || Pedro || || 
|-
| Concrete Revolutio || Magotake Hitoyoshi || ||
|-
| Bungo Stray Dogs || André Gide || ||
|-
| Pocket Monsters: Sun & Moon || Kojirō (James), Glazio's Lugarugan (Gladion's Lycanroc) || || 
|-
| Mob Psycho 100 || Megumu Koyama || || 
|-
| rowspan="4" | 2017 || March Comes in Like a Lion || Kai Shimada || 2 seasons || 
|-
| Yōjo Senki: Saga of Tanya the Evil || Erich Rerugen || ||
|-
| Symphogear AXZ || Adam Weishaupt || ||
|-
| Two Car || Coach Tanabashi || || 
|-
| rowspan="4" | 2018 || Hugtto! PreCure || Ristle || ||
|-
| Bakumatsu || Ryouma Sakamoto || ||
|-
| Legend of the Galactic Heroes: Die Neue These || Walter von Schönkopf || ||
|-
| Lord of Vermilion: The Crimson King || Kāku Kaburagi || || 
|-
| rowspan="7" | 2019 || Isekai Quartet || Relgen || || 
|-
| No Guns Life || Danny Yo || ||
|-
| Fate/Grand Order - Absolute Demonic Front: Babylonia || Leonidas I || || 
|-
| Demon Slayer: Kimetsu no Yaiba || Tanjuro Kamado || ||
|-
| Bakumatsu Crisis || Ryouma Sakamoto || ||
|-
|Bakugan: Battle Planet || Benton Dusk || ||
|-
| My Hero Academia 4 || Sir Nighteye || || 
|-
| rowspan="7" |2020
| Breakers || | Ren Narita || || 
|-
|Dorohedoro| Turkey || || 
|-
|Super HxEros || Jō Anno || ||  
|-
|Bakugan: Armored Alliance || Benton Dusk || ||
|-
|The Misfit of Demon King Academy || Zorro Angato || ||  
|-
|The God of Highschool || Oh Seong Jin || ||
|-
|Sleepy Princess in the Demon Castle || Hypnos || || 
|-
| rowspan="5" | 2021 || Welcome to Demon School! Iruma-kun Season 2 || Ari || || 
|-
| I'm Standing on a Million Lives Season 2 || Canteele || || 
|-
| Life Lessons with Uramichi Oniisan || Yusao Furode || || 
|-
| Detective Conan: Police Academy Arc || Kenji Hagiwara || || 
|-
| Dragon Quest: The Adventure of Dai || Hym || ||
|-
| rowspan="7" | 2022 || Shaman King || Yohken Asakura || || 
|-
| Salaryman's Club || Tatsuru Miyazumi || || 
|-
| Estab Life: Great Escape || Urura || || 
|-
| RWBY: Ice Queendom || Roman Torchwick || || 
|-
| Shine On! Bakumatsu Bad Boys! || Sōgen || || 
|-
| Reincarnated as a Sword || Master || || 
|-
| Bleach: Thousand-Year Blood War || Kisuke Urahara || || 
|-
| rowspan="4" | 2023 || The Fire Hunter || Haijū || || 
|-
| My Home Hero || Yoshitatsu Matori || || 
|-
| The Marginal Service || Theodore Tompson || || 
|-
| Bullbuster || Kōji Tajima || || 
|-
| rowspan="2" |  || | Uzumaki || Shuichi Saito || || 
|-
| Yōjo Senki: Saga of Tanya the Evil II || Erich Rerugen || ||
|-
|}

Original net animation

Animated films

Video games

Live-action

Tokusatsu

Dubbing roles

Live-action

Animation

Other MediaFrom Far Away (彼方から'') CD Drama (1999): Izark Kia Tarj

References

External links
 
 

1968 births
20th-century Japanese male actors
21st-century Japanese male actors
81 Produce voice actors
Japanese male video game actors
Japanese male voice actors
Living people
Male voice actors from Tokyo
Seiyu Award winners